The Roman Catholic Diocese of Xiwanzi/Chongli is a diocese located in the city of Xiwanzi in the Ecclesiastical province of Suiyuan in China.

History
 August 20, 1840: Established as Apostolic Vicariate of Mongolia 蒙古 from the Apostolic Vicariate of Liaotung 遼東
 December 21, 1883: Renamed as Apostolic Vicariate of Central Mongolia 中蒙古
 March 14, 1922: Renamed as Apostolic Vicariate of Chahar 察哈爾
 December 3, 1924: Renamed as Apostolic Vicariate of Xiwanzi 西彎子
 April 11, 1946: Promoted as Diocese of Xiwanzi 西彎子

Leadership
 Bishops of Xiwanzi (Roman rite)
 Bishop Andrew Hao Jinli (1988 - 2011)
 Bishop Melchior Zhang Kexing (張克興) (November 24, 1951 – November 6, 1988)
 Bishop Leone Giovanni M. De Smedt, C.I.C.M. (April 11, 1946 – November 24, 1951)
 Vicars Apostolic of Xiwanzi 西彎子 (Roman Rite)
 Bishop Leone Giovanni M. De Smedt, C.I.C.M. (December 14, 1931 – April 11, 1946)
 Bishop Everard Ter Laak, C.I.C.M. (January 12, 1924 – May 5, 1931)
 Vicars Apostolic of Chahaer 察哈爾 (Roman Rite)
 Bishop Jeroom Van Aertselaer, C.I.C.M. (May 1, 1898 – January 12, 1924)
 Vicars Apostolic of Mongolia 蒙古 (Roman Rite)
 Bishop Florent Daguin, C.M. (July 17, 1857 – May 9, 1859)
 Bishop Joseph-Martial Mouly, C.M. (孟振生) (August 23, 1840 – April 28, 1846)

References

 GCatholic.org
 Catholic Hierarchy

Roman Catholic dioceses in China
Religious organizations established in 1840
Roman Catholic dioceses and prelatures established in the 19th century
1840 establishments in China